The 2022–23 Bundesliga is the 60th season of the Bundesliga, Germany's premier football competition. It began on 5 August 2022 and is scheduled to conclude on 27 May 2023.

Bayern Munich are the ten-time consecutive defending champions.

As the 2022 FIFA World Cup was held between 20 November and 18 December 2022 due to the climatic conditions of the host country Qatar, the league featured an extended pause during the season. As national team players had to be released by their clubs on 14 November 2022, the last Bundesliga matchday before the break was played from 11–13 November (matchday 15). The league resumed ten weeks later on 20 January 2023.

The fixtures were announced on 17 June 2022.

Teams

A total of 18 teams will participate in the 2022–23 edition of the Bundesliga.

Team changes

Stadiums and locations

Personnel and kits

Managerial changes

League table

Results

Relegation play-offs
The relegation play-offs will take place on 31 May or 1 June and 5 or 7 June 2023.

Statistics

Top goalscorers

Top assists

Hat-tricks

Clean sheets

Number of teams by state

Awards

Monthly awards

References

External links

Bundesliga seasons
1
Germany
Germany